The Secretary of Family Affairs of Puerto Rico leads the Department of Family Affairs of Puerto Rico and all efforts related to the sociology of the family and social work in Puerto Rico.

List of Secretaries of Family Affairs 
 2009–2012: Yanitsia Irizarry Méndez
 2013–2016: Idalia Colón Rondón
 2017–present: Glorimar Andújar Matos

References

Council of Secretaries of Puerto Rico
Department of Family Affairs of Puerto Rico